Albert Waller Gilchrist (January 15, 1858 – May 15, 1926) was an American politician who served as the 20th governor of Florida. A Democrat, Gilchrist was born in South Carolina before moving to Punta Gorda, Florida. He was elected to the Florida House of Representatives in 1893 and served as speaker in 1905. Gilchrist is the namesake for Gilchrist County, Florida.

Early life and education
Born in Greenwood, South Carolina, Gilchrist first attended Carolina Military Institute in Charlotte, North Carolina, where he was a member of Sigma Alpha Epsilon fraternity before attending the United States Military Academy at West Point. He would have graduated in 1882, but he did not because he was deficient in experimental philosophy after three years.

Early career
Gilchrist became a civil engineer and real estate dealer before settling in Punta Gorda, Florida, to become an orange grower. He served in the Florida state militia until 1898, reaching the rank of brigadier general. Gilchrist went on to join the Company C, of the 3rd U.S. Volunteer Infantry, and served in the U.S. Army during the Spanish–American War in Cuba. He reached the rank of captain in the regular army, before being discharged in 1899.

Political career
In 1893, Gilchrist was elected to the Florida House of Representatives, serving until 1897. He represented DeSoto County, Florida. He returned in 1903, and in 1905 he became Speaker of the Florida House and left the legislature.

Gilchrist was elected governor on November 3, 1908, taking the oath of office on January 5, 1909. As governor, Gilchrist prioritized public health. For instance, he promoted legislation for a pure food law, improved health conditions for state prisoners, a tuberculosis sanitarium, and a "hospital for impoverished crippled children."

Also during his tenure as Governor, the Monteverde Industrial School was established, new counties were formed, and, following eight years of work, mainland Florida was finally connected to the Florida Keys via an overseas railroad. He left office on January 7, 1913, going on to unsuccessfully run for U.S. Senate in 1916 and serving as a delegate to the 1924 Democratic National Convention.

Death
Gilchrist died on May 15, 1926, in New York, New York. Upon his death, the bachelor governor left a large portion of his estate to local orphans. He is buried at Indian Springs Cemetery on Indian Springs Road in Punta Gorda, Florida.

Legacy
After hearing that the former Governor was dying in a New York hospital, the Florida Legislature quickly introduced and passed a bill naming Gilchrist County after him. The Gilchrist Bridge, which carries U.S. Route 41 south over the Peace River from Port Charlotte to Punta Gorda, is named after Gilchrist.

Controversy 
In 2020, Teddy Ehmann, president of the Charlotte County Historical Society, urged the Punta Gorda City Council to rename Gilchrist Park, of which Gilchrist was the namesake for. In his letter to the council, Ehmann called Gilchrist a "Southern racist" and asked the council to recognize the indigenous Calusa tribe.

Theresa Murtha, director of the Punta Gorda History Center, called the proposal "outrageous". She pointed out Gilchrist's legacy as the only Governor of Florida from Punta Gorda, as well as his role in the foundation of the city. Former cataloger Lynn Harrell claimed Gilchrist hired a crew of seven to eight black railroad employees, adding that "he wouldn’t have had a Black crew” if he was a racist.

References

External links 
 

American people of Scottish descent
1858 births
1926 deaths
Democratic Party governors of Florida
People from Punta Gorda, Florida
20th-century American politicians
19th-century American politicians
People from Greenwood, South Carolina
Speakers of the Florida House of Representatives
Democratic Party members of the Florida House of Representatives